The 2010 Colorado Rapids season was the fifteenth year and season of the club's existence. It was Colorado's fifteenth year in Major League Soccer, and the sixth-consecutive year for the club in the top-flight of American soccer.

Following a disappointing ninth-place finish in the regular season, head coach Gary Smith began to revamp and overhaul the roster, making numerous inexpensive moves to sign low-key MLS players to fit the salary cap demands at one of few franchises with no Designated Players. The Rapids were able to improve slightly in the MLS regular season, finishing in seventh place, scoring 15 goals and conceding only 4 in their last 6 home games, with 4 wins 3 draws and 3 losses in their last 10 league games. In the MLS Cup playoffs, the team started to gel, Colorado defeat Columbus in a very tense penalty shoot out and then San Jose 1-0 at home, in a one leg tie, before defeating Dallas against all the odds 2-1 AET for their first MLS Cup title.

In addition to MLS and MLS Cup Playoffs, Colorado participated in the play-in propers of the U.S. Open Cup before being knocked out 3-0 by New York in the fourth round proper.

Background

Review

Preseason

March 

Colorado began their sixth Major League Soccer regular season on the road with a 1–0 win against Chivas USA on March 28, 2010.

April 
Colorado played their first home match against the Chicago Fire on April 3, earning a point in a 2–2 draw.

May

June

July

August

September

October 
The Rapids entered the 2010 MLS Cup Playoffs as the third seed in the Eastern Conference, despite playing in the Western Conference. In the Conference Semifinals, Colorado defeated the Columbus Crew at home 1–0 in the first of two legs.

November 
The Rapids played the second leg of their Conference Semifinal matchup in Columbus. After 90 minutes of play, the Crew were on top 2–1, meaning the two teams were tied on aggregate goals 2-2. After playing a scoreless extra period, the two teams went into a penalty shootout, where the Rapids would prevail 5–4. Colorado would follow up with a home win over the San Jose Earthquakes in the Conference Final to advance to the Cup Final.

MLS Cup 2010 was played on a neutral field at BMO Field, home of Toronto FC. The Rapids faced off against FC Dallas, the third seed in the Western Conference. The teams would go into extra time, where the match was decided by an own goal from FC Dallas defender George John in the 107th minute. The Rapids would win the match 2–1, and won their first MLS Cup in club history.

Match results

Preseason

MLS regular season

March

April

May

June

July

August

September

October

MLS Playoffs

U.S. Open Cup

League table 

Conference

Overall

Results summary

Squad

Current roster 
As of May 5, 2010.

Notes

Colorado Rapids seasons
Colorado Rapids
Colorado Rapids
Colorado Rapids
MLS Cup champion seasons